Dropout Kings (formerly Phoenix Down) is an American nu metal band from Phoenix, Arizona, United States, that formed in 2016. They are currently signed to Suburban Noize Records and have released one album and one EP: Audiodope and GlitchGang, which were released August 10, 2018 and April 6, 2021.

History
Dropout Kings was founded by Adam Ramey after his previous band The Bad Chapter broke up in 2015. As a way to stay active musically, he approached rapper Eddie Wellz to do a cover of Linkin Park's “Lying From You” after seeing a video of Wellz performing on YouTube. Due to a positive reception, Ramey approached previous members of The Bad Chapter; Trevor Norgren and later Staig Flynn and Rob Sebastian and previous bandmate Chucky Guzman from We The Collectors to form a new band called Phoenix Down, which by 2017 had changed its name to Dropout Kings.

On April 6, 2018, it was announced that Dropout Kings signed with Napalm Records, & the band released the music video for '"NVM", their first single from their debut album AudioDope the same day. On June 8, 2018, the band released the music video for "Scratch & Claw", the second single off of AudioDope. AudioDope was released on August 10, 2018. AudioDope reached 2 US Charts, #52-Top New Artist Albums & #112-Record Label Independent Current Albums.

In July–August 2018, the band toured the United States and Canada with OTEP. During the Otep tour, the band announced that they were managed by Dez Fafara, the lead vocalist for DevilDriver & Coal Chamber.

In February–March 2019, the band toured with Outline in Color, Deadships and Dead Crown.

On March 19, 2019, Dayshell featured the band on their single “KOMBAT."

In May–June 2019, the band joined Crazy Town as direct support on their 20th Anniversary Tour.

On May 26, 2019, it was announced that the band would be playing the Main Stage at the 20th Annual Soopa Gathering of the Juggalos on August 3, 2019.

On April 6, 2021, it was announced that Dropout Kings had signed to Suburban Noize Records.

On June 15, 2021, Dropout Kings embarked on their first headlining tour.

On September 8, 2021, “Virus” peaked at #33 on the Billboard Mainstream Rock Radio Charts while spending 12 weeks in the Top 40.

On October 26, 2021, it was announced that “Virus” was being considered for a Grammy nomination in the Best New Artist category.

On January 24, 2022, it was announced that Dropout Kings would be playing at UFest 2022 on April 24, 2022.

Members

Current Members 
 Adam Ramey - lead vocals (2016–present)
 Eddie Wellz - rap vocals (2016–present)
 Chucky Guzman - guitars (2016–present)
 Staig Flynn - guitars (2017–present)
 Rob Sebastian - bass (2017–present)
 Joe Lana Jr. - drums, percussion (2021–present)

Former Members 
 Trevor Norgren - drums, percussion (2016–2021)
 Tre Scott - guitar, bass (2016–2017)
 Charlie Mumbles - turntables, programming (2016–2017)

Timeline

Discography

Studio albums
 AudioDope (2018)

EPs
GlitchGang (2020 Stay Sick Recordings, reissued 2021 on Suburban Noize Records)

Singles
 "Street Sharks" (2016; as Phoenix Down)
 "NVM" (2018)
 "Scratch & Claw" (2018)
 "Going Rogue feat. Landon Tewers" (2018)
 "GlitchGang" (2020)
 "I Ain't Depressed feat. Hacktivist" (2020)
 "Virus feat. Shayley Bourget" (2021) – No. 33 Mainstream Rock Songs

Music videos
 "Street Sharks" (2016; as Phoenix Down)
 "NVM" (2018)
 "Scratch & Claw" (2018)
 "Going Rogue" (2018)
 "Bad Day" (2019)
 "Something Awful" (2019)
 "GlitchGang" (2020)
 "Virus" (2020)
 "I Ain't Depressed" (2020)
 "PitUp" (2021)
 "Hey Uh" (2022)

References

External links
 

Musical groups established in 2016
American nu metal musical groups
Trap metal musicians
2016 establishments in Arizona